Anthurium manabianum is a species of plant in the family Araceae. It is endemic to Ecuador. Its natural habitat is subtropical or tropical dry forests. It is threatened by habitat loss although efforts are now being made to prevent this.

References

Endemic flora of Ecuador
manabianum
Vulnerable plants
Taxonomy articles created by Polbot